A false accusation of rape happens when a person states that they or another person have been raped when no rape has occurred.

Although some studies attempt to characterize the prevalence of false accusation of rape, according to a 2013 book on forensic victimology, the true percentage remains unknown due to the varying definitions of a "false accusation".

Rates of false accusation are sometimes inflated or misrepresented due to conflation with terms such as unfounded. These designations, which allow law enforcement to close cases without arriving at a conclusion, are used to describe reports without enough evidence, as opposed to cases where the accuser is not credible or says that the account is untrue.

With regard to racism in the United States, false accusations of rape have been made by White women against African American men, with the Whites having greater influence in the judicial system, often resulting in wrongful convictions. Such incidents have historically led to extrajudicial acts of violence such as lynchings.

Causes 
Causes of false accusations of rape may fall into two categories: non-deliberate deception (such as false memories), and lies.

False memories
There are several ways in which an alleged victim can accidentally come to believe that they have been raped by the person(s) they accuse. These include, but are not limited to:
 Recovered-memory therapy: memories of sexual abuse 'recovered' during therapy in the absence of any supporting evidence, based on the Freudian notion of "repression"
 The victim's confusion of the memory of the real rapist with the memory of someone else
 Memory conformity: memory can become contaminated when co-witnesses discuss their recollection of events

Lies
An accuser may have several motivations to falsely claim they have been raped. There is disagreement on how many different categories these may be put into. Kanin (1994) put them in three: revenge, producing an alibi or to get sympathy/attention. Author Sandra Newman listed four categories in 2017. According to De Zutter et al. (2017), Kanin's division is inadequate and one should recognise eight distinct categories in total:
 Material gain: to receive money, professional promotion or other material benefits, such as, claiming to be raped on government property or by a government employee so as to file a lawsuit against the government. "The resulting suit against the government will typically only be one in a series of fraudulent claims. 
 Producing an alibi: a false allegation is used to cover up other behaviour, such as being late to or absent from an appointment.
 Revenge: to retaliate against a disliked person by damaging the reputation, freedom or finances.
 Attention: an attempt to receive any kind of attention, positive or negative, by anyone.
 Sympathy: a special kind of attention-seeking whereby the complainant tries to improve a personal relationship with a specific individual.
 'A disturbed mental state'; this may include false memories ("sexual hallucinations") or pathologic lying.
 Relabeling: consensual sex is relabeled 'rape' to the police, because of its 'disappointing or shameful character'. De Zutter et al. argue that a distinction should be made between some acts during a consensual sexual encounter that a participant did not want or had no desire to engage in but nonetheless gave consent to (e.g., to please their partner) on the one hand, and rape (nonconsensual sex) on the other, but that many lay people and even some scholars do not make this distinction and confuse the two. It is often when accounts of such 'unwanted consensual sex' are told to friends and family that the latter interpret it as rape, and put the complainant under pressure to file an allegation.
 Regret: after having had consensual sex, a complainant experiences negative feelings such as disgust, shame, and sorrow; when others notice this and ask about the source of these negative feelings, they are prone to view the encounter as rape and put the complainant under pressure to file an allegation.

Facilitated communication

Facilitated communication (FC) is a scientifically discredited technique that attempts to aid communication by people with autism or other communication disabilities who are non-verbal. The facilitator guides the disabled person's arm or hand and attempts to help them type on a keyboard or other device. Research indicates that the facilitator is the source of the messages obtained through FC, not the disabled person. However, the facilitator may believe they are not the source of the messages due to the ideomotor effect, which is the same effect that guides a Ouija board. There have been a number of accusations of sexual abuse made through facilitated communication. As of 1995, there were sixty known cases, with an unknown numbers of others settled without reaching public visibility.

'Don't know'
According to De Zutter et al. (2017), 20% of complainants said that they did not know why they had filed a false allegation.

Estimates of prevalence 
It is extremely difficult to assess the prevalence of false accusations. All jurisdictions have a distinct classification of false accusation, resulting in these cases being combined with other types of cases (e.g. where the accuser did not physically resist the suspect or sustain injuries) under headings such as "unfounded" or "unproved". There are many reasons other than falsity that can result in a rape case being closed as unfounded or unproven.

DiCanio (1993) states that while researchers and prosecutors do not agree on the exact percentage of cases in which there was sufficient evidence to conclude that allegations were false, they generally agree on a range of 2% to 10%. A meta-analysis of seven studies gives the rate of 5%, though the authors conclude, that the "total false reporting rate, including both confirmed and equivocal cases, would be greater than the 5% rate found here". 

Due to varying definitions of a "false accusation", as well as some cases, where there is no evidence to show that the reports are true or false, are in fact false, the true percentage remains unknown. A Meta-Analysis of False Reporting Rates noted that: “It is arguable that reports made to someone other than police, would involve a higher false allegation rate, since they are easily made, there are fewer consequences, and sometimes greater benefits for the accuser”.

A 2009 study of rape cases across Europe found the proportion of cases designated false ranged from four to nine percent.

Another complicating factor is that data regarding false allegations generally do not come from studies designed to estimate the prevalence of false allegations; rather, they come from reviews of data regarding investigations and prosecutions within criminal justice systems. The goal of such investigations is to determine whether or not there is sufficient evidence to prosecute, not to evaluate the cases for which there is not sufficient evidence to prosecute and classify such cases as "false" or "true".

Archives of Sexual Behavior (2016) 
Claire E. Ferguson and John M. Malouff conducted a meta-analysis of confirmed false rape reporting rates in the Archives of Sexual Behavior in 2016, and found that 5.2% of cases were confirmed false rape reports.

Los Angeles Police Department (2014) 
Researchers Cassia Spohn, Clair White and Katharine Tellis examined data provided by the Los Angeles Police Department in the US from 2008, and found that false reports among rape cases was about 4.5 percent. Upon review of Cassia Spohn's work, the Los Angeles District Attorney's Office, which initially collaborated in the report, concluded "the perspective, conclusions and policy recommendations are inconsistent with American constitutional principles of justice, due process protections and the ethical obligations of prosecutors." The LADO noted that Spohn et al. likely had ideological biases against the accused and "failed to develop an understanding of the criminal justice system in Los Angeles County."

Crown Prosecution Service report (2011–2012) 
A report by the Crown Prosecution Service (CPS) examined rape allegations in England and Wales over a 17-month period between January 2011 and May 2012. It showed that in 35 cases authorities prosecuted a person for making a false allegation, while they brought 5,651 prosecutions for rape. Keir Starmer, the head of the CPS, said that the "mere fact that someone did not pursue a complaint or retracted it, is not of itself evidence that it was false" and that it is a "misplaced belief" that false accusations of rape are commonplace. He added that the report also showed that a significant number of false allegations of rape (and domestic violence) "involved young, often vulnerable people. About half of the cases involved people aged 21 years old and under, and some involved people with mental health difficulties. In some cases, the person alleged to have made the false report had undoubtedly been the victim of some kind of offence, even if not the one that he or she had reported."

Lisak, USA (2010)
David Lisak's study, published in 2010 in Violence Against Women, classified as demonstrably false 8 out of the 136 (5.9%) reported rapes at an American university over a ten-year period. However, a much larger number of reports (44.9%) were classified by the authors as "Case Did Not Proceed", which includes reports that could ultimately be determined to be false allegations, though how many is unknown.

Applying IACP guidelines, a case was classified as a false report if there was evidence that a thorough investigation was pursued and that the investigation had yielded evidence that the reported sexual assault had in fact not occurred. A thorough investigation would involve, potentially, multiple interviews of the alleged perpetrator, the victim, and other witnesses, and where applicable, the collection of other forensic evidence (e.g., medical records, security camera records). For example, if key elements of a victim's account of an assault were internally inconsistent and directly contradicted by multiple witnesses and if the victim then altered those key elements of his or her account, investigators might conclude that the report was false. That conclusion would have been based not on a single interview, or on intuitions about the credibility of the victim, but on a "preponderance of evidence gathered over the course of a thorough investigation."

Burman, Lovett & Kelly, Europe (2009)  
In a study of the first 100 rape reports after April 1, 2004, in Scotland, researchers found that about 4% of reports were designated by police to be false. In a separate report by the same researchers that year which studied primary data from several countries in Europe, including Austria, Belgium, England, France, Germany, Greece, Hungary, Ireland, Portugal, Scotland, Sweden, and Wales, found the average proportion of reports designated by police as false was about 4%, and wasn't higher than 9% in any country they studied. They noted that cases where the police doubt the allegation may be "hidden in the ‘no evidence of sexual assault' category" instead of designated false category and suggested more detailed research into explicating both categories.

Ministry of Justice, UK (2008–2009) 
The UK Ministry of Justice in their Research Series published a report describing the analysis of 1,149 case files of violent crimes recorded April 2008 to March 2009. They noted that 12% of rape allegations fell into a broader definition of false accusations (victim was intoxicated, there was a delay in reporting the crime, victim retracted the complaint after the fact, or no evidence of bodily harm was recorded). Approximately 3% of the rape allegations were identified as malicious (determined to be intentionally false). When it came to cases with grievous bodily harm (GBH), even the broader definition (no evidence, delayed report, retraction, or intoxicated victim) accounted for only 2% of crimes.

Rumney (2006)

A 2006 paper by Philip N.S. Rumney in the Cambridge Law Journal offers a review of studies of false reporting in the US, New Zealand and the UK. Rumney draws two conclusions from his review of literature. First, the police continue to misapply the "no-crime" or "unfounding" criteria.  Studies by Kelly et al. (2005), Lea et al. (2003), HMCPSI/HMIC (2002), Harris and Grace (1999), Smith (1989), and others found that police decisions to no-crime were frequently dubious and based entirely on the officer's personal judgment.  Rumney notes that some officers seem to "have fixed views and expectations about how genuine rape victims should react to their victimization".  He adds that "qualitative research also suggests that some officers continue to exhibit an unjustified scepticism of rape complainants, while others interpret such things as lack of evidence or complaint withdrawal as 'proof' of a false allegation".

Rumney's second conclusion is that it is impossible to "discern with any degree of certainty the actual rate of false allegations" because many of the studies of false allegations have adopted unreliable or untested research methodologies. He argues, for instance, that in addition to their small sample size, the studies by Maclean (1979) and Stewart (1981) used questionable criteria to judge an allegation to be false. MacLean deemed reports "false" if, for instance, the victim did not appear "dishevelled" and Stewart, in one instance, considered a case disproved, stating that "it was totally impossible to have removed her extremely tight undergarments from her extremely large body against her will".

Criticism 
American psychologist David Lisak criticized the collection of studies used in Rumney's 2006 paper, which estimated the rate of false allegations as between 1.5 and 90%. Lisak stated that many of the stats are misleading upon investigation and "when the sources of these estimates are examined carefully it is clear that only a fraction of the reports represent credible studies and that these credible studies indicate far less variability in false reporting rates." Lisak points out that even in the original paper, Rumney concludes that many of the studies have inadequacies and should not be used to estimate the frequency of false rape reports.

Statistics Canada (2018) 
According to Statistics Canada, 19% and 14% of sexual assault allegations were deemed unfounded in 2016 and 2017, respectively. It also declared, however, that more severe and violent cases of sexual assault were less likely to be declared unfounded than less severe ones. Cases declared to be unfounded are cases where police has determined that the assault did not occur and was not attempted.

According to the Globe and Mail, the statistics about unfounded cases are often kept secret, providing no incentive for police forces to analyze and account for them.

Police in Victoria, Australia (2006)
A study of 850 rape accusations made to police in Victoria, Australia between 2000 and 2003 found that 2.1% were ultimately classified by police as false, with the complainants then charged or threatened with charges for filing a false police report.

Home Office study, UK (2005) 
The Home Office on UK rape crime in 2005 released a study that followed 2,643 sexual assault cases from initial reporting of a rape through to legal prosecutions. The study was based on 2,643 sexual assault cases; of these, police classified 8% as false reports based on police judgement, and the rate was 2.5% when determined using official criteria for false reports. The researchers concluded that "one cannot take all police designations at face value" and that "[t]here is an over-estimation of the scale of false allegations by both police officers and prosecutors."

Jordan, New Zealand (2004) 

Jan Jordan of the Victoria University of Wellington examined police files from 1997 on rape and sexual assault from Auckland, Wellington and Christchurch. Around 75% of the 164 police files concerned rape, the rest concerned sexual assault cases without penile penetration. Jordan separated cases into four main categories. First, in 34 cases (21%), the police considered the complaint to be genuine. Second, in 62 cases (38%), the police were unsure if the complaint was true or false. Third, in 55 cases (33%), the police considered the complaint to be false. Fourth, in 13 cases (8%), the complainant stated that their allegations were false. For the cases in this fourth category, 8 of these 13 cases (62%) had another party calling the police on the complainant's behalf, or another party pressuring the complainant to contact the police.

Kennedy and Witkowski, USA (2000) 
The Kanin study was replicated by Daniel Kennedy and Michael Witkowski of the University of Detroit. They recorded data from the period of 1988 to 1997 in an unnamed suburb of around 100,000, situated close to Detroit in the American state of Michigan. The authors found 68 reports of forcible rape, of which in 22 cases (32%) the complainants admitted that their reports were false. Similar to the Kanin study, most of these false reports served as an alibi (15 out of 22, 68% of the false reports). Diverging from the Kanin study, revenge was rarely cited as a reason (1 out of 22, 5% of the false reports). The remaining cases were cited to attention-seeking (6 out of 22, 27% of false reports).

FBI statistics, USA (1995–1997) 
In the US, FBI reports from 1995, 1996, and 1997 consistently put the number of "unfounded" forcible rape accusations around 8%. In contrast, the average rate of unfounded reports for all "index crimes" (murder, aggravated assault, forcible rape, robbery, arson, burglary, larceny-theft, and motor vehicle theft) tracked by the FBI is 2%. This estimate, however, does not appear in subsequent FBI reports. This estimate was criticised by academic Bruce Gross as almost meaningless as many jurisdictions from which FBI collects data use different definition of "unfounded", which, he wrote, includes cases where the victim did not physically fight off the suspect or the suspect did not use a weapon, and cases where the victim had a prior relationship to the suspect.

Kanin, USA (1994)
In 1994, Eugene J. Kanin of Purdue University investigated the incidences of false rape allegations made to the police in one small urban community in the Midwest United States (population 70,000) between 1978 and 1987. He states that unlike in many larger jurisdictions, this police department had the resources to "seriously record and pursue to closure all rape complaints, regardless of their merits". He further states each investigation "always involves a serious offer to polygraph the complainants and the suspects" and "the complainant must admit that no rape had occurred. She is the sole agent who can say that the rape charge is false".

The number of false rape allegations in the studied period was 45; this was 41% of the 109 total complaints filed in this period.  The researchers verified, whenever possible, for all of the complainants who recanted their allegations, that their new account of the events matched the accused's version of events.

After reviewing the police files, Kanin categorized the false accusations into three broad motivations: alibis, revenge, and attention-seeking. These motivations were assigned prevalence of roughly 50%, 30%, and 20% respectively. This categorization was supported by the details of complainant recantations and other documentation of their cases.

Kanin also investigated the combined police records of two large Midwestern universities over a three-year period (1986–1988) and found that 50% of the reported forcible rapes were determined to be false accusations (32 of the total 64). No polygraphs were used, the investigations were the sole responsibility of a ranking female officer, and a rape charge was only counted as false under complainant recantation. In this sample, the motivations mentioned above were roughly evenly split between alibi and revenge, with only one case characterized as attention-seeking.

Criticism 
Critics of Kanin's report include David Lisak, an associate professor of psychology and director of the Men's Sexual Trauma Research Project at the University of Massachusetts Boston. He states, "Kanin's 1994 article on false allegations is a provocative opinion piece, but it is not a scientific study of the issue of false reporting of rape. It certainly should never be used to assert a scientific foundation for the frequency of false allegations."

According to Lisak, Kanin's study lacked any kind of systematic methodology and did not independently define a false report, instead recording as false any report which the police department classified as false, whereas Kanin stated that the women filing the false allegations of rape had recanted. The department classified reports as false which the complainant later said were false, but Lisak points out that Kanin's study did not scrutinize the police's processes or employ independent checkers to protect results from bias.

Kanin, Lisak writes, took his data from a police department which used investigation procedures (polygraphs) that are discouraged by the U.S. Justice Department and denounced by the International Association of Chiefs of Police. These procedures include the "serious offer", in this department, of polygraph testing of complainants, which is viewed as a tactic of intimidation that leads victims to avoid the justice process and which, Lisak says, is "based on the misperception that a significant percentage of sexual assault reports are false". The police department's "biases...were then echoed in Kanin's unchallenged reporting of their findings". While also noting some of the same criticisms of Kanin, Rumney's 2006 metastudy of US and UK false rape allegation studies adds that "if, indeed, officers did abide by this policy then the 41% could, in fact, be an underestimate given the restrictive definition of false complaints offered by the police in this study. The reliability of these findings may be somewhat bolstered by the fact that the police appeared to record the details and circumstances of the fabrications."

Bruce Gross writes in the Forensic Examiner that Kanin's study is an example of the limitations of existing studies on false rape accusations. "Small sample sizes and non-representative samples preclude generalizability." Philip N.S. Rumney questions the reliability of Kanin's study stating that it "must be approached with caution". He argues that the study's most significant problem is Kanin's assumption "that police officers abided by departmental policy in only labeling as false those cases where the complainant admitted to fabrication. He does not consider that actual police practice, as other studies have shown, might have departed from guidelines."

Police handling of rape reports
Surveys of police and prosecutors find that many in law enforcement consistently over-estimate the prevalence of false accusations, leading to what some researchers have characterized as a culture of skepticism toward accusers in sexual assault cases. In 2018, Lesley McMillan analysed police perception of likelihood of false reporting of rape. She concluded though police anticipated 5% to 95% of claims were likely to be false, no more than 3-4% could have been fabricated.

Possible effects of media representation 
There are studies about the extent which the media affects the public perception of false rape accusations. Incorrect assumptions about false rape allegations increases the likelihood that a person who reports rape will be blamed or disbelieved. Megan Sacks in Deviant Behavior says that the media perpetuates rape myths when reporting on sexual assaults. Rapes that are reported in news media are typically sensational and do not often correspond with the reality of most rapes. For example, the majority of sexual assaults are committed by someone the person knows as opposed to a stranger. Sacks says, the media also normalizes sexual violence in general, often blames the person who reported the assault, and commonly expresses sympathy for the alleged perpetrators instead of the victim. Laura Niemi, a postdoctoral psychology associate at Harvard University, speculated that mythologizing of rape could contribute to the idea that "no normal person" could rape. As a result, the people commonly had a difficult time believing someone they know or like is a rapist, and this could contribute to the idea that the person who reported the rape is at fault.

In the European Journal of Psychology Applied to Legal Context, André De Zutter and a team described how false rape allegations often resemble stories of rape portrayed in the media, which are not typical of most true incidents of rape. False stories tend to be quick and straightforward with few details or complex interactions, and usually involve only vaginal intercourse. Some behaviors associated with lying by juries is actually typical of true rapes, including kissing or a previous relationship with the rapist.  True rape reports often include many details rarely seen in media or false rape reports, for example pseudo-intimate actions, detailed verbal interactions and an otherwise wide range of behaviors besides simply face-to-face vaginal intercourse.

Legal consequences of false accusations

United Kingdom 
Individuals suspected of making a false accusation of rape may be charged with the civil crime of "wasting police time" or the criminal charge of "Perverting the Course of Justice".
Over a five-year period ending in 2014, a total of 109 women were prosecuted for crimes related to making false accusations of rape. The report did not indicate the verdicts following prosecution. Another report identified 121 charging decisions involving allegations of false accusations of rape and an additional 11 false allegations of both domestic violence and rape between January 2011 and May 2012 and found of these cases, 35 were prosecuted based upon false accusations of rape. A further 3 were prosecuted based upon charges of false accusations of both rape and domestic abuse. The report did not indicate the verdicts following prosecution.

Historical racism

Justification for lynchings

In 1895, Ida B. Wells published The Red Record which documented lynchings from 1892 and their causes. Of the 241 lynchings she documented, rape and murder were the two most common justifications for lynchings. Wells found that many victims of lynching had been falsely accused of rape or some other offense because they had engaged in economic competition with white-owned businesses. Subsequent analyses have confirmed Wells' argument that economic competition caused lynchings and found that lynchings increased during difficult economic times. In other cases, African American men had consensual sexual relationships with white women and were lynched after the relationships were discovered by other people.

In Louisiana, rape was the second most common reason used between 1889 and 1896 to justify a lynching. In a survey done in the 1930s of a small town in Mississippi, 60 percent of respondents stated that lynching was an appropriate response to a case of rape and that it was necessary to maintain law and order and protect white women.

Jim Crow

There are several notable cases of violence after an accusation of rape during the Jim Crow era.

In the Tulsa race massacre of 1921, white mobs killed between 75 and 300 people, mostly black, and injured an additional 800 people. The massacre began over a false allegation that a 19-year-old black shoeshiner had attempted to rape a white 17-year-old elevator operator.

The Rosewood massacre of 1923 began after a white woman in nearby Sumner claimed that she had been physically assaulted by a black man from Rosewood. Rumors circulated that she was raped and robbed. An angry mob surrounded a house which was filled with black residents and a standoff ensued. The mob killed several people inside the house and two white people were killed outside it. This event attracted additional angry mobs which razed Rosewood to the ground. Black residents fled into the forest, escaped in cars, and escaped on a train. At a minimum, eight black people and two white people were killed, but it is possible that as many as 150 black residents were killed.

Two white women falsely accused the Scottsboro Boys, a group of nine African American boys and young men, of rape on a train in 1931. They had boarded a train across state lines in hopes of finding work but they were stopped by police. One of the accusers was rumored to be "a common street prostitute of the lowest type" who had been overhead asking "negro men" about the size of their "private parts". She was reputed to be a heavy drinker. Afraid that they would be arrested for violating the Mann Act, they told police that they had been raped by nine black men who were aboard the train. White southerners argued that the women's histories of prostitution should not impact the case, in the words of one contemporary account "[she] might be a fallen woman, but by God she is a white woman." The mob that gathered to lynch the men was only dispersed by assurances of a speedy trial.

A song about the case from that era:
Messin' white women
Snake lyin' tale
Dat hang and burn
And jail wit' no bail

The case inspired a national movement to free the men. Eight of the boys were found guilty and the case was appealed to the Alabama Supreme Court and then it was appealed to the United States Supreme Court twice. In Powell v. Alabama the United States Supreme Court reversed the Alabama Supreme Court's decision because it found that the defendants had inadequate counsel. In Patterson v. Alabama the United States Supreme Court sent the case back to Alabama for retrial because the Alabama Supreme Court's jury pool had excluded African-Americans, a violation of the Equal Protection Clause of the Fourteenth Amendment. Five of the nine Scottsboro boys were ultimately found guilty and sentenced to prison. In 2013, Alabama's parole board voted to grant posthumous pardons to all of the Scottsboro Boys who had previously not been pardoned because their convictions had not been overturned.

See also 

Brian Banks – An example from 2002
Central Park jogger case, in which several men of color were wrongfully convicted of a real assault
Centurion Ministries – advocacy
Death of Eleanor de Freitas
Duke lacrosse case – an example from 2006
False allegation of child sexual abuse
Families Advocating for Campus Equality (FACE)
Hofstra University rape case
Innocence Project – advocacy
Parkinson case - an Australian example from 2014
Phaedra (mythology) – a story of a false accusation of rape from Greek mythology
Potiphar's wife – a story of a false accusation of rape from the Hebrew Bible
Racial hoax
Recovered memory therapy
Runaway bride case
Tawana Brawley rape allegations – an example from 1987
Treva Throneberry
Satanic ritual abuse

References

Further reading

External links
 Dr. Carol Tavris' presentation at TAM 2014 Who's Lying, Who's Self-Justifying? Origins of the He Said/She Said Gap in Sexual Allegations  (online video)

Criminology

Lying
Rape
Stereotypes of white women